Tribuna de La Habana is a Cuban newspaper. It is published in Spanish and is located in Havana.

External links 
Tribuna de La Habana online 

Newspapers published in Cuba
Publications with year of establishment missing
Mass media in Havana